De Soto USD 232 is a public unified school district headquartered in De Soto, Kansas, United States.  The district includes the communities of De Soto, 60% of Shawnee, 40% of Lenexa, fraction of Olathe, and nearby rural areas.

History
As of the 2013–2014 school year, the district's attendance is roughly 7,000. 

Most of the district's students live in the City of Shawnee.

Schools
The school district operates the following schools:

De Soto High School, home of the Wildcats
Mill Valley High School, home of the Jaguars

Lexington Trails Middle School, home of the Panthers
Monticello Trails Middle School, home of the Timberwolves
Mill Creek Middle School, home of the Mustangs

Belmont Elementary School
Clear Creek Elementary School
Horizon Elementary School
Mize Elementary School
Prairie Ridge Elementary School
Riverview Elementary School
Starside Elementary School

See also
 List of high schools in Kansas
 List of unified school districts in Kansas
 Kansas State Department of Education
 Kansas State High School Activities Association

References

External links
 

School districts in Kansas
Education in Johnson County, Kansas